Lovers is the second album by Italian post-hardcore band Dufresne. It was released April 11, 2008.

The album was recorded in October, 2007 in Richmond, Virginia at Red Planet Studios, produced by Andreas Magnusson.

Track listing

Credits 
 Nicola "Dominik" Cerantola - lead vocals
 Matteo "Ciube" Tabacco - bass, backup vocals
 Luca Dal Lago - guitar
 Alessandro Costa - keyboards
 Davide Zenorini - drums

References 

Universal Music Italy albums
V2 Records albums
2008 albums
Dufresne (band) albums
Italian-language albums